Eugene Gifford Grace (August 27, 1876 – July 7, 1960) was the president of Bethlehem Steel Corporation from 1916 to 1945, and chairman of the board from 1945 until his retirement in 1957. He also served as president of the American Iron and Steel Institute, and sat on the board of trustees for Lehigh University.

Early years 
He was born in Cape May, New Jersey, the son of a sea captain John W. Grace, and Rebecca Grace. He married Marion Brown, daughter of Charles Brown, co-founder of the Brown-Borhek lumber supply company. Grace attended Lehigh University in Bethlehem, Pennsylvania, and played for the university baseball team. He was  considered to be one of their best players, playing shortstop and batting a .400 average. Upon graduation in 1899, at the top of his class and as valedictorian, he turned down a contract to play for the Boston Braves to work as a crane operator for Bethlehem Steel. Though his friends doubted his decision, by 1913 he had worked his way up to become president of the company, and three years later, president of the corporation.

Industrial career 

Grace led the company through World War I, tripling the company's steel output over the course of the war. By 1929, through several acquisitions, the company operated nine major steel plants. He is quoted as saying "Gentlemen, we are going to make a lot of money." when informed of the outbreak of World War II in 1939. He was right, as Bethlehem Steel quickly became one of the major steel suppliers of the war, as well as constructing many ships for the United States Navy. The company constructed 1,127 ships for the U.S. military during the war years. In 1941, he received the second highest salary and compensation package in the U.S., $522,637. During his career, Grace earned a reputation for strident anti-unionism.

After the war, Grace led the company to retool for peace time, and they changed focus to building bridges, including the Verrazano-Narrows Bridge, and skyscrapers. Grace was generous with the money he earned, and donated much to Lehigh University and the city of Bethlehem. He retired from the company in 1957. He died in 1960 and was buried in Nisky Hill Cemetery in a site overlooking the steel plant in South Bethlehem.

References

External links

Eugene Gifford Grace at Explore PA History

1876 births
1960 deaths
American steel industry businesspeople
Bethlehem Steel people
Crane operators
Lehigh University alumni
People from Bethlehem, Pennsylvania
People from Cape May, New Jersey